Karanasa huebneri is a butterfly species belonging to the family Nymphalidae. It is found in northern Pakistan and India.

References

Satyrini
Butterflies described in 1867
Butterflies of Asia
Taxa named by Baron Cajetan von Felder
Taxa named by Rudolf Felder